The Sialkot Cavalry Brigade was a cavalry brigade of the British Indian Army formed in 1904 as a result of the Kitchener Reforms.  It was mobilized as 2nd (Sialkot) Cavalry Brigade at the outbreak of the First World War as part of the 1st Indian Cavalry Division and departed for France.  It served on the Western Front with the division until it was broken up in March 1918.

The brigade was reformed in June 1920 and broken up in January 1940.

History
The Kitchener Reforms, carried out during Lord Kitchener's tenure as Commander-in-Chief, India (1902–09), completed the unification of the three former Presidency armies, the Punjab Frontier Force, the Hyderabad Contingent and other local forces into one Indian Army.  Kitchener identified the Indian Army's main task as the defence of the North-West Frontier against foreign aggression (particularly Russian expansion into Afghanistan) with internal security relegated to a secondary role.  The Army was organized into divisions and brigades that would act as field formations but also included internal security troops.

The Sialkot Brigade (also referred to as Sialkote Brigade) was formed in April 1904 as a result of the Kitchener Reforms.  The brigade formed part of the 2nd (Rawalpindi) Division.  By the outbreak of the First World War it was designated as Sialkot Cavalry Brigade.

2nd (Sialkot) Cavalry Brigade

In September 1914, the brigade was mobilized as the 2nd (Sialkot) Cavalry Brigade and assigned to the 1st Indian Cavalry Division.  With the division, it departed Bombay on 16 October 1914 and landed at Marseilles on 7 November.  However, the brigade did not reach the Front until 8–10 December due to horse sickness.  While in France, the brigade was known by its geographical rather than numerical designation so as to avoid confusion with the British 2nd Cavalry Brigade also serving on the Western Front at the same time.

Other than the Battle of Cambrai when it helped to hold the German counter-attack, it was not involved in battle. Instead, it was held in reserve in case of a breakthrough, although it did send parties to the trenches on a number of occasions. They would hold the line, or act as Pioneers; such parties were designated as the Sialkot Battalion.

Dissolved
In March 1918, the brigade was broken up in France. The British units (17th (Duke of Cambridge's Own) Lancers and Q Battery, Royal Horse Artillery) remained in France and the Indian elements were sent to Egypt. On 24 April 1918, these were merged with the 22nd Mounted Brigade of the Yeomanry Mounted Division. On 22 July 1918 the 22nd Mounted Brigade was redesignated as 12th Cavalry Brigade and the division as 4th Cavalry Division.

Reformed
The Sialkot Cavalry Brigade was reformed in June 1920.  In September 1920 it was designated as the 2nd Indian Cavalry Brigade and renamed as 2nd (Sialkot) Cavalry Brigade in
1927.  By the outbreak of the Second World War it was resdesignated as Sialkot Brigade Area and it was broken up again in January 1940.

Orders of battle

Commanders
The Sialkot Cavalry Brigade / 2nd (Sialkot) Cavalry Brigade had the following commanders:

See also

 Indian Cavalry Corps order of battle First World War
 Indian Expeditionary Force A

Notes

References

Bibliography

External links
 
 
 
 

C02
Cavalry brigades of the British Indian Army
Military units and formations established in 1904
Military units and formations disestablished in 1918
Military units and formations established in 1920
Military units and formations disestablished in 1940